The Xingning Academy is an ancient structure in Xingning, China. Now part of Xingmin High School, it was originally built during the Ming Dynasty (13681644).

External links
 Article on the academy (Chinese)
 A photo

Xingning, Guangdong
Buildings and structures in Guangdong
Education in Guangdong